Shannon Fisher is a writer, social and political commentator, and the host of two talk radio shows on the Authors on the Air Global Radio Network, The Authentic Woman and Our Lives with Shannon Fisher. She is also a frequent host of the National Press Club's Update-1 Podcast. and a notable women's rights activist.

Radio host

Fisher began her career in radio in September 2013 as a panelist on the Authors on the Air Global Radio Network's show, A Global Conversation on Domestic Violence. She went on to host A Global Conversation on Human and Sex Trafficking in February 2014 and was subsequently asked by the network's owner to do a weekly show on women's social and political issues, in addition to highlighting women with careers in the arts. In February 2017, Fisher began hosting an additional show on the network, Our Lives with Shannon Fisher, which covers a broader range of global societal issues.

Fisher is also among a small team of hosts of the National Press Club's Update-1 Podcast, which addresses current events from the perspective of the news media.

Activism

Fisher participated in a demonstration on March 3, 2012 against transvaginal ultrasound legislation in the Virginia General Assembly, during which approximately 1000 protesters marched through the streets of downtown Richmond, Virginia to the steps of the Virginia Capitol building. Thirty protesters were arrested. Photographs of the event were shared worldwide, encouraging protests against similar legislation introduced in other state legislatures.  The Virginia protest was featured in the film Political Bodies, which won "Best Documentary" at the Austin Film Festival in 2013.

In January 2013, Fisher was included among women's rights activists named the "2012 Richmonders of the Year" for their participation in the March 2012 protest by the staff of Richmond's Style Weekly alternative newspaper.

Fisher co-founded UniteWomen.org's "Unite Against Rape" campaign, along with fellow executive committee members Renee Davis, Karen Teegarden and Sarah Warfield Chamberlin. The raised public awareness of the issues of rape, human trafficking and violence against women. An array of legislators, journalists and celebrities participated in the campaign, including U.S. Senators Mark Warner and Tim Kaine; comedians Roseanne Barr, Margaret Cho, Annabelle Gurwitch and Lois Bromfield; social justice advocate Sandra Fluke; Philadelphia Eagles defensive tackle, Ronnie Cameron, musician Courtney Love; social and political commentators Meghan McCain, Alexandria Goddard (the Steubenville blogger), Leslie Salzillo, Kimberley A. Johnson and Tanya Tatum; Editor-in-Chief Jane Pratt; writers Mandy Stadtmiller, Alison Freer, Marci Robin and Julia Allison; actors Yuri Lowenthal, Pia Glenn and Sharon Gardner; celebrity artist Tormented Sugar; writers Herman Williams, III, Pat Bertram, Michele Rolle and Toni Morrison; executive director of the Military Rape Crisis Center, Panayiota Bertzikis; and celebrity relationship experts Dr. Gilda Carle and Dr. Sheri Meyers.

The "Unite Against Rape" team also partnered with the Rape, Abuse & Incest National Network for a national RAINN Day campaign to raise awareness of sexual assault on college campuses.

Fisher spoke on the grounds of the Washington Monument on November 9, 2014 at an event held by the Global Woman P.E.A.C.E. Foundation to help raise awareness of female genital mutilation.

Education
Fisher is a 2002 graduate and Past Class Chair of the Sorensen Institute for Political Leadership at The University of Virginia and received her undergraduate degree from The College of William and Mary in 1994.

Writings
Fisher's articles and essays have been published in newspapers, magazines, anthologies, news sites and blogs since the 1990s. She writes about Society, Politics, Health, Entertainment, and Pop Culture.

"Why ‘Slacktivism’ Matters" is an article Fisher wrote for PBS, explaining various methods of Social Media Activism and demonstrating its potential effectiveness in raising global awareness using the #BringBackOurGirls hashtag as an example.

Memberships
Fisher is a member of the National Press Club, the Society of Professional Journalists and the Online News Association. She is an alumna of the Beta Delta chapter of Alpha Chi Omega.

Notable radio shows and podcasts

References

External links
Official website
Shannon Fisher's blog at wordpress.com
UniteWomen.org website
Authors on the Air website

Living people
American women's rights activists
Radio personalities from Virginia
College of William & Mary alumni
American women writers
American non-fiction writers
American women journalists
Year of birth missing (living people)